The Row is a set of historic homes located at Lyme in Jefferson County, New York. It consists of three contiguous mid-19th century vernacular Greek Revival style houses and their associated outbuildings.  The houses were built between about 1845 and 1850 and each is of heavy wood-frame construction on a coursed rubble limestone foundation.  The outbuildings are two privies and a carriage barn.

It was listed on the National Register of Historic Places in 1990.

References

Greek Revival houses in New York (state)
Houses completed in 1850
Houses in Jefferson County, New York
Houses on the National Register of Historic Places in New York (state)
National Register of Historic Places in Jefferson County, New York